Sugarloaf Parkway is an at-grade and limited-access highway in Gwinnett County in the north-central part of the U.S. state of Georgia. The highway provides a cross-county route from Duluth to Dacula.  In 2010, a freeway extension opened past the former eastern terminus at Georgia State Route 20 (SR 20), and the highway was extended to US 29/SR 316 (University Parkway) in Dacula.

Route description

Sugarloaf Parkway begins at an intersection with Peachtree Industrial Boulevard in Duluth. It travels in a southeasterly direction. Almost immediately is an intersection with US 23/SR 13 (Buford Highway). Upon leaving Duluth, it intersects Old Peachtree Road NW. It continues to an interchange with Interstate 85 (I-85) and passes to the east of Sugarloaf Mills. Then, it intersects SR 120 (Duluth Highway). After skirting along the northeastern edge of Gwinnett Technical College, it has an interchange with SR 316 (University Parkway). The parkway passes to the east of Gwinnett School of Mathematics, Science, and Technology and intersects US 29/SR 8 (Lawrenceville Highway) just southwest of Lawrenceville. After curving to the east, it intersects SR 124 (Scenic Highway). It skims the southern edge of the Gwinnett County Fairgrounds and meets SR 20 (Grayson Highway). Here, the highway becomes a limited-access road and travels to the northeast. It has an interchange with New Hope Road. Then, it has interchanges with Martins Chapel Road/Brooks Road SE and Campbell Road. The parkway continues to the northeast and enters Dacula, where it meets its eastern terminus, an interchange with US 29/SR 316 (University Parkway).

Future

Sugarloaf Parkway is planned to have an extension to I-85 as part of the Northern Arc (SR 500), an abandoned freeway plan resurrected in October 2017. The extension, known as the Sugarloaf Parkway Extension, Phase II, is planned to be a tollway, and will connect SR 316 with I-85 near Buford.

Major intersections

See also

References

Transportation in Gwinnett County, Georgia
Parkways in the United States